In Greek mythology, Myrtilus (Ancient Greek: Μυρτίλος) was a divine hero and son of Hermes. His mother is said variously to be the Amazon Myrto; Phaethusa, daughter of Danaus; or a nymph or mortal woman named Clytie, Clymene or Cleobule (Theobule). Myrtilus was the charioteer of King Oenomaus of Pisa in Elis, on the northwest coast of the Peloponnesus.

Mythology 
On the eve of the fateful horse race that would decide the marriage between Pelops and Hippodamia, Myrtilus was approached by Pelops (or in some accounts, by Hippodamia) who wanted him to hinder the efforts of his master, Oenomaus, to win the race. Myrtilus was offered as bribe the privilege of the first night with Hippodamia.

Myrtilus, who loved Hippodamia himself but was too afraid to ask her hand of her father, agreed and sabotaged the king's chariot by replacing the bronze linchpins with fake ones made of bees' wax. In the ensuing accident Oenomaus lost his life, cursing Myrtilus as he died. Shortly thereafter Myrtilus tried to seduce Hippodamia, who ran crying to Pelops, although Myrtilus said this was the bargain. Enraged, Pelops murdered Myrtilus by casting him into the sea off the east coast of the Peloponnesus, which was later named the Myrtoan Sea in honor of the hero. His body was later recovered and brought in the temple of Hermes where it was honored with annual sacrifices. Some say that Myrtilus was transformed into the constellation of Auriga.

As Myrtilus died, he cursed Pelops. This curse would haunt future generations of Pelops' family, including Atreus, Thyestes, Agamemnon, Aegisthus, Menelaus, Orestes and Chrysippus. Also, the burial place of Myrtilus was a taraxippus in Olympia.

Notes

References
 Gaius Julius Hyginus, Astronomica from The Myths of Hyginus translated and edited by Mary Grant. University of Kansas Publications in Humanistic Studies. Online version at the Topos Text Project.
Gaius Julius Hyginus, Fabulae from The Myths of Hyginus translated and edited by Mary Grant. University of Kansas Publications in Humanistic Studies. Online version at the Topos Text Project.
Sir William Smith, A new classical dictionary of Greek and Roman biography, mythology and geography: partly based upon the Dictionary of Greek and Roman biography and mythology, Harper and brothers, 1862, page 621

Spoken-word myths - audio files 

Children of Hermes
Elean mythology
Aegean Sea in mythology
Greek mythological heroes
Ancient Olympia